Ana Cristina Oliveira Leite (born 23 October 1991) is a Portuguese-German football forward, currently playing for Bayer 04 Leverkusen in Germany's Frauen Bundesliga.

Born in Bocholt, Germany, Ana Cristina played club football in the Frauen Bundesliga while she studied at university in Bochum.

She was a member of the U-17 German national team, but subsequently chose to play for Portugal. She debuted for the senior Portugal women's national football team in the 2010 Algarve Cup and debuted one month later against Italy in the 2011 World Cup qualifying.

Honours 

FCR 2001 Duisburg
 UEFA Women's Champions League: Winner 2008–09
 DFB-Pokal: Winner 2008–2009, 2009–2010

References

External links
 
 

1991 births
Living people
People from Bocholt, Germany
Sportspeople from Münster (region)
German people of Portuguese descent
Citizens of Portugal through descent
German women's footballers
Portuguese women's footballers
FCR 2001 Duisburg players
SGS Essen players
Borussia Mönchengladbach (women) players
Bayer 04 Leverkusen (women) players
Portugal women's international footballers
Women's association football forwards
Footballers from North Rhine-Westphalia
Campeonato Nacional de Futebol Feminino players
Sporting CP (women's football) players
UEFA Women's Euro 2017 players